"Slow It Down" is a song by British boy band East 17, released in April 1993 as the fourth single from the band's debut album, Walthamstow (1993). It was a number one hit in Israel and peaked within the top 10 in Lithuania. In Ireland and the United Kingdom, the single was a top 20 hit.

Critical reception
In his weekly UK chart commentary, James Masterton wrote, "Feeling at last they may have found their niche, the aspiring teen sensations follow up the Top 10 succes of "Deep" with another pop/rap track in a similar vein. Whether the same thing twice will sell remains to be seen - it's a tactic rivals Take That have deliberately steered clear of." Tom Doyle from Smash Hits gave it two out of five, viewing it as "their weakest single to date."

Music video
A music video was produced to promote the single, directed by Chris Clunn and Lawrence Watson. It shows the band performing in front of a white backdrop. The video was later published on YouTube in August 2020.

Charts

References

1993 singles
1993 songs
East 17 songs
Songs written by Tony Mortimer
Number-one singles in Israel